Monroe Township is one of ten townships in Jefferson County, Indiana, United States. As of the 2010 census, its population was 374 and it contained 176 housing units.

History

Monroe was the next-to-last township created by the Jefferson County commissioners. It was carved from Lancaster Township on March 11, 1842. Much of township became part of the former Jefferson Proving Ground and a substantial part of the population relocated. As a result, there are few institutions or businesses remaining. The Hebron Baptist and Liberty Christian Churches are the only churches and there are no schools or post offices in Monroe Township.

Monroe has had the following post offices: Alberta: (May 4, 1893-Jan. 31, 1899) Belleview: (March 15, 1890 – May 31, 1906). Its name was changed from Mud Lick; Big Creek: (Aug. 11, 1884-Oct. 31 1889). Re-established (Feb. 10, 1891-Apr. 30, 1903); Bryantsburgh (June 10, 1834-Dec. 12, 1856); Re-commissioned (Jan. 18, 1858-Dec. 10, 1872); Re-established (March 1, 1873 – July 29, 1907) The name waschanged to Bryantsburg on June 10, 1893; Calloway (May 22, 1893-Apr. 15, 1901); Evans Rural Station  (Oct. 1, 1902-Sept. 30, 1934) Faulkner (July 7, 1882-Apr. 30, 1903) How (Dec. 15, 1884-Oct. 15, 1895); Ridpath: (Sept. 17, 1897-April 30, 1903).

Discontinued churches in the township include an Adventist Church that was meeting in the township in 1889. Its dates are not known. The Big Creek Methodist Church was founded about Dec. 5, 1842 when trustees purchased land for a building. Its cemetery was moved to Madison in 1941. Bryantsburg Presbyterian Church, an offshoot of the Monroe Presbyterian Church, was formed by Sept. 22, 1854 when its trustees acquired land from the parent congregation. Bryantsburg failed by April 30, 1867, when its trustees sold the church property. The Mt. Zion Pilgrim Holiness Church formed by May 2, 1922 when the congregation elected trustees. The Marble Methodist Church, later called Marble Valley and Old Marble, opened on May 28, 1859, according to the June 2, 1859  issue of the Madison Courier. The Union Methodist Church first elected trustees on March 3, 1855. Located on the east side of the Michigan Road, just south of Belleview, it was still active in 1916.

Another church, the Monroe Presbyterian Church, combined with the Smyrna Presbyterian Church when its site was taken in the creation of the Jefferson Proving Ground. It was originally called Middlefork Presbyterian  when the first members joined on Sept. 25, 1830. The name was changed to Lancaster Presbyterian in 1833 as Monroe was still part of Lancaster Township. The church divided on June 22, 1839 with the Old School Presbyterian group calling itself the Lancaster Presbyterian Church and the New School quickly adopting the name Monroe. The bodies united in 1870 under the name Monroe.

The division was formalized on June 22, 1839 when the Old School Group wrote a statement of beliefs and their names in the session book.

The Hebron Church, which still meets in its building on Graham Road, was formed in March 1828. Its church cemetery was founded in 1815 as a community cemetery, but became associated with the church. The Liberty Christian Church in Belleview was founded in 1817 as a New Light Church, a dissident Presbyterian group. It soon became a Disciples of Christ congregation. Today, and for the past several decades, Liberty is and has been an un-denominational Christian church, basing its doctrine solely on the Bible, and following the patterns of the original new testament church established by Christ through His apostles. Originally located on the west side of the Michigan Road, the building was taken by the government in 1941. However, the congregation purchased the structure and relocated it to the east side of the road. Since remodeled, parts of the original church were incorporated in the building.

Oakdale School on the grounds of Jefferson Proving Ground was listed on the National Register of Historic Places in 1993.

Geography
The streams of Big Creek, Middle Fork; Toddys Branch and the West Fork Indian-Kentuck Creek run through this township.

Unincorporated towns
 Belleview
 Bryantsburg

Extinct towns
 Galloways Station. The U.S. board of geographic names is incorrect in labeling this Galloways Station, but has refused to acknowledge the mistake, which appears to be the  result of typographical error. It was Calloway Station and the post office was Calloway. The map of Jefferson County in the 1876 Indian Historical Atlas Indiana Board of Tax Commissioners map of ca. 1896 and Galbraith's Railway Service Map of 1897/98 show the location as Calloway or Calloway's Station. In the 1988 edition of the Callaway Journal, a Callaway family publication, it was listed as Callaway's Station.

Adjacent townships
 Shelby Township, Ripley County (north)
 Shelby Township (east)
 Madison Township (south)
 Smyrna Township (southwest)
 Lancaster Township (west)
 Bigger Township, Jennings County (northwest)

Cemeteries
The township contains three cemeteries: Grandview Memorial Garden, Hebron Church Cemetery and Smith Cemetery. Grandview is a commercially operated facility that opened in the 1900s. Hebron was the only township cemetery not relocated after the founding of the former Jefferson Proving Ground in 1941. the Smith-Smart Cemetery, which was moved to Graham Rd, north of the Hebron Baptist Church, was originally located on the Michigan Road, near the Bayless Cemetery, which itself was in Madison Township and was also relocated.

Burials in the Baxter, Big Creek, Mt. Monroe, Marble Valley, and Monroe Cemeteries were removed to the east side of the Michigan Road (U.S. highway 421), south of Fairmount Cemetery in north Madison.

Major highways
  U.S. Route 421
  Indiana State Road 62
  Indiana State Road 250

References
 U.S. Board on Geographic Names (GNIS)
 United States Census Bureau cartographic boundary files

Baker, J. David, The Postal History of Indiana, 1976, Philatelic Bibliophile, P.O. Box 213971, Louisville, Ky. 1976.

Gresham, John M. & Co., 1889. Biographical & Historical Souvenir for the Counties of Clark, Crawford, Harrison, Floyd, Jefferson, Jennings, Scott and Washington.

Library of Congress, Geographic Map Division, American Memory Collection, Railroad Maps 1828–1900.  http://memory.loc.gov/ammem/gmdhtml/rrhtml/rrhome.html

External links
 Indiana Township Association
 United Township Association of Indiana
 Liberty Christian Church http://www.liberty-christian.com

Townships in Jefferson County, Indiana
Townships in Indiana